Aasroy is a 2000 Bengali film directed by Haranath Chakraborty and produced by Sukumar Bhadra. The film features actors Prosenjit Chatterjee and Rituparna Sengupta in the lead roles. Music of the film has been composed by Babul Bose.

Plot
Dr. Ankhu (Deepankar De) a heart specialist has lost his wife and lives with their son, Sudhanshu (Prosenjit). Eventually Dr. Ankhu marries again and his new wife, Bonashri takes good care of Sudhanshu (Prosenjit), whom she likes very much. Sudhanshu falls in love with Joysree (Rituparna Sengupta), a charming girl. As the relationship blossoms, Joysree reveals the secret about her parentage. She is an orphan who lost her mother as a child. She was brought up by three eunuchs, who took very good care of her. Even after listening to all this, Sudhanshu decides to marry her and puts forward the proposal to his parents. His father does not agree to the match but his step mother supports him in his decision. In the meantime, Sudhanshu has an accident. At this time Joysree takes very good care of him and he recovers fast. Dr. Ankhu realises that Joysree is indeed the right match for his son and agrees to the marriage.

Cast 

 Prosenjit Chatterjee
 Rituparna Sengupta
 Deepankar De
 Laboni Sarkar
 Subhendu Chatterjee
 Kaushik Banerjee

Soundtrack

Awards

|-
| 2001
| Prosenjit Chatterjee
| BFJA Awards For Best Actor
| 
|}

References

External links

2000 films
Bengali-language Indian films
2000s Bengali-language films
Films scored by Babul Bose
Films directed by Haranath Chakraborty